Faustin Butéra (born 20 September 1955) is a Rwandan sprinter. He competed in the men's 400 metres at the 1984 Summer Olympics.

References

1955 births
Living people
Athletes (track and field) at the 1984 Summer Olympics
Rwandan male sprinters
Rwandan male hurdlers
Olympic athletes of Rwanda
Place of birth missing (living people)